Brzezówka  is hamlet of the village Domatków
(SIMC 0652174 Brzezówka - przysiółek) in the administrative district of Gmina Kolbuszowa, within Kolbuszowa County, Subcarpathian Voivodeship, in south-eastern Poland.

The hamlet of village has a population of 371.

References 

Brzezówka, Kolbuszowa County